Marcus Allen (born 1972) is an American former football running back. 

Marcus Allen may also refer to:
Marcus Allen (linebacker) (born 1996), American football player
Timothy J. Boham (born 1981), adult-film star who uses the stage name Marcus Allen

See also
Marcus Allan (born 1986), Australian rules footballer
  (born 1945), a popular Finnish singer
Mark Allen (disambiguation)